Mount Alice is a mountain rising to  at the south extremity of West Falkland, Falkland Islands in the South Atlantic. It is situated between the bays of Port Stephens and Port Albemarle,  due north of Cape Meredith.

After the Falklands War the mountain became the home of No. 751 Signals Unit RAF, an air defence radar unit.

The mountain's top is now occupied by Remote Radar Head (RRH)  Mount Alice of the British Forces South Atlantic Islands (BFSAI), part of an early warning and airspace control network including also RRH Byron Heights on West Falkland and RRH Mount Kent on East Falkland.

References

External links
 Panoramic airview of Mount Alice Radar Station with Port Albemarle in the background
 Interactive satellite image of Mount Alice

Mountains of West Falkland
Military of the Falkland Islands